Magdalena Stysiak (born 3 December 2000) is a Polish volleyball player.

She participated at the 2018 Women's U19 Volleyball European Championship, 2019 Women's European Volleyball Championship, 2019 Montreux Volley Masters, 2019 FIVB Volleyball Women's Nations League , and 2020 Summer Olympics qualification.

On the club level, she played for KPS Chemik Police, Pallavolo Scandicci, and Vero Volley Monza.

References 

2000 births
Polish women's volleyball players
Living people